The 1st Indus Drama Awards ceremony, presented by Indus TV Network, sponsored by Dulux, took place on 23 September 2005, at PAF Museum, Karachi. The ceremony was recorded, and was scheduled to be televised in Pakistan and UAE on October 1, 2005, by Indus TV. It was produced by chairman Ghazanfar Ali.

The awards were hosted by actor Shahood Alvi and co-hosted by Sehar Imran.

Ceremony information
The drama awards were a follow-up of the IM Music awards, art of the INDUS NETWORK, which were held at the D.H.A Golf Club. The stage was set against a giant plasma screen and for the first time a live orchestra had been arranged.

The four series competing for the most prestigious honours were 'Maa Aur Mamta', 'Ambulance', 'Mera Naam Hai Mohabbat' and 'Karachi law'. Kamran Qureshi’s drama series Maa Aur Mamta was considered most successful with seven awards; Qureshi brought his mother Shagufta Yousuf to receive it on his behalf. Natasha D’souza received her trophy for the best supporting actress in 'Ambulance". Shafi Mohammad won the best supporting actor for his role in 'Maa aur Mamta'. The best actress in drama series was Shehla Qureshi for her role in "Mehak" while Humayun Saeed won the equivalent for Mujrim.

Further entertainment was provided by Humayun and Sonu, both of whom danced, Sonu to Atif Aslam's remix song 'Woh Lamhe'. Maa and Mamta also won an extra title when Sohail Asghar was conferred a special award for his role of a eunuch called Saima in Murad.

A tribute was performed for Najam-uz-Zaman, who had died in Canada. Najam was a prominent figure in Indus Music and was also one of Indus TV's founding members, besides the current owner, Ghazanfar.

The best serial writer award went to Umera Ahmed for Wajood-e-Laraib. The best actress in a drama serial went to Afreen for role in Azal, for which her male counterpart was Faisal Rehman for his contributions in Azal.

The Best Serial award went to Wajood-e-Laraib. Adnan Siddiqui, Faisal Qureshi, and Fahad Mustafa received the trophy. Adnan dedicated the trophy to his newborn baby, while the rest thanked the crowd for their involvement.

Qavi Khan received a standing ovation for his contributions to the TV world with the late Shahzad Khalil. Ghazanfar himself presented this award to Khalil's wife Badar Khalil.

Awards
Winners are listed first followed by nominees.

Honorary Indus Drama Awards
The Indus Media Group presented Special Awards during the ceremony. These are usually are not a part of specific category, but a special honor for artists related to drama.

Special Contribution for Script Writing
 Ashfaq Ahmed

Special Contribution for Comedy
 Moin Akhtar

Special Award for Outstanding Contribution to TV
 Shahzad Khalil

Special Contributing to Drama
 Qavi Khan

Special Award for Direction of Fifty Fifty
 Shoaib Mansoor

Special Award for outstanding performance in Murad
 Sohail Asghar

Special Award for Tribute
 Najam-uz-Zaman (Award received by Najam-uz-Zaman's Mother)

Special Award for performance in Fifty Fifty
 Zeba Shahnaz

Multiple awards and nominations

Series with multiple nominations

Series with multiple awards

Serials with multiple nominations

Serials with multiple awards

Presenters and performers
The following individuals and groups, listed in order of appearance, presented awards or performed musical numbers.

Presenters

Performers

See also

 List of Asian television awards
 Indus Telefilm Festival
 Lux Style Awards
 Hum Awards

References

External links
 
 Facebook Page

Awards established in 2005
2005 television awards
Pakistani television awards
Festivals in Karachi
Annual events in Pakistan